The Crystal River is a tributary of the Roaring Fork River, approximately  long, in Gunnison and Pitkin counties in Colorado, United States.

Description
The river drains a glacial valley, called the Coal Basin, south of Carbondale which was historically known as a center of coal mining in southwestern Colorado. It rises in northern Gunnison County in the Elk Mountains on the north side of Schofield Pass, passing through the ghost town of Crystal City, still inhabited by a few summer residents. It then flows north past Marble, then into Pitkin County past Redstone. It joins the Roaring Fork below Carbondale. State Highway 133 follows the river along much of its route north of Marble.

From Crystal City to Marble the river flows through the Crystal River Canyon, a narrow valley with numerous snowslide runs, rockfalls, and other hazardous terrain.  Although it is locally known as a fishing and hiking attraction the unpaved and largely un-maintained mining road, designated Gunnison County Road 3 on Mapquest, is nearly impassable to vehicles other than ATVs and off-road motorcycles.  A four-wheel-drive Jeep tour is operated out of Marble, but only operates during the summer when the road is not blocked by snow, mud, or rock slides.

See also

 List of rivers of Colorado
 List of tributaries of the Colorado River

References

External links

Rivers of Gunnison County, Colorado
Rivers of Pitkin County, Colorado
Rivers of Colorado
Roaring Fork Valley
Tributaries of the Colorado River in Colorado